The Cavan-Monaghan rivalry is a Gaelic football rivalry between Irish county teams Cavan and Monaghan, who first played each other in 1888. It is considered to be one of the biggest rivalries in Ulster Gaelic games. Cavan's home ground is Kingspan Breffni Park and Monaghan's home ground is St Tiernach's Park.

All-time results

Legend

Senior

References

Monaghan
Monaghan county football team rivalries